The seventh season of the television series, Law & Order: Special Victims Unit premiered September 20, 2005 and ended May 16, 2006 on NBC. It aired on Tuesday nights at 10pm/9c. Critically the show's most successful season, both lead actors received nominations at the 58th Primetime Emmy Awards with a win by Mariska Hargitay.

Production
Repeating a pattern established by other SVU seasons, the Season 7 premiere was filmed before the airing of the Season 6 finale. Long-time SVU co-executive producers, Michele Fazekas, Tara Butters, and Lisa Marie Petersen departed the series at the end of Season 7. Additionally, long-time Law & Order franchise director Constantine Makris departed until his return in the twelfth season.

Mariska Hargitay won the Primetime Emmy Award for Outstanding Lead Actress in a Drama Series for her performance in the episode "911". This made her the first regular cast member of any Law & Order series to win an Emmy. Christopher Meloni was nominated for the Primetime Emmy Award for Outstanding Lead Actor in a Drama Series, his first Emmy nomination. Meloni was water skiing when the 2006 Emmy nominations were announced. He received a congratulatory call from showrunner Neal Baer and responded with "Cool! I'm going back to ski." Meloni's nomination was apparently for the episode "Ripped". The Envelope section of The LA Times reported that SVU also made a bid for Ted Kotcheff to receive the Primetime Emmy Award for Outstanding Directing for a Drama Series, but he was not selected as a nominee.

Cast changes and returning characters
Tamara Tunie, after five seasons playing recurring medical examiner, Dr. Melinda Warner, was added to the opening credits. Judith Light, who had played Bureau Chief ADA Elizabeth Donnelly in seasons three, four and six, returned for the seventh season but with her character acting as a judge. The seventh was the first season not to have an appearance by Isabel Gillies as Kathy Stabler. This is because the actress was in Ohio, working on her marriage.

Dr. Rebecca Hendrix, the recurring character from the previous season, was brought back for the episode "Ripped". Played by Mary Stuart Masterson, she helps Detective Stabler come to terms with unresolved issues in what Neal Baer called "an emotionally devastating scene". In addition, the guest star Ernest Waddell from the previous season had his character, Ken Randall, further explored in the episodes "Strain" and "Venom".

Season 7 was Fred Thompson's last season on SVU even though he continued to play DA Arthur Branch on Law & Order for another year. Diane Neal gave an interview about working with him during the seventh season. She compared him to her father, who is a federal attorney, saying: "They're both southern, they're both large, they're both lawyers, they're both the same age, they're both football kind of guys."

Cast

Main cast
 Christopher Meloni as Senior Detective Elliot Stabler
 Mariska Hargitay as Junior Detective Olivia Benson
 Richard Belzer as Senior Detective John Munch
 Diane Neal as Assistant District Attorney Casey Novak
 Ice-T as Junior Detective Odafin "Fin" Tutuola
 BD Wong as FBI Special Agent Dr. George Huang
 Tamara Tunie as Medical Examiner Dr. Melinda Warner
 Dann Florek as Captain Donald "Don" Cragen

Crossover stars
 Fred Dalton Thompson as District Attorney Arthur Branch (Crossing over with Law & Order)

Recurring cast

 Mike Doyle as Crime Scene Technician Ryan O'Halloran
 Joel de la Fuente as Technical Assistance Response Unit Technician Ruben Morales
 Stephen Gregory as Dr. Kyle Beresford
 Joselin Reyes as Paramedic Martinez
 Judith Light as Judge Elizabeth Donnelly
 Joanna Merlin as Judge Lena Petrovsky
 Caren Browning as Crime Scene Unit Captain Judith Siper
 Paula Garcés as Crime Scene Unit Forensics Technician Millie Vizcarrondo
 Jill Marie Lawrence as Defense Attorney Cleo Conrad
 J. Paul Nicholas as Defense Attorney Linden Delroy
 Audrie J. Neenan as Judge Lois Preston
 Ian Bedford as Officer Bamford
 Peter McRobbie as Judge Walter Bradley
 Annie Potts as Defense Attorney Sophie Devere

 Francis Jue as Dr. Fong
 David Thornton as Defense Attorney Lionel Granger
 Joe Grifasi as Defense Attorney Hahsi Horowitz
 Ned Eisenberg as Defense Attorney Roger Kressler
 Joe Lisi as Parole Officer Craig Lennon
 John Cullum as Defense Attorney Barry Moredock
 Joseph E. Murray as Emergency Medical Technician Olson
 Donnetta Lavinia Grays as Officer Ramirez
 Ernest Waddell as Ken Randall
 William H. Burns as Officer Robbins
 Tom O'Rourke as Judge Mark Seligman
 Patricia Kalember as Judge Karen Taten
 Peter Riegert as Defense Attorney Chauncey Zeirko

Guest stars

The season premiere "Demons" showed Christopher Meloni sharing psychologically intense scenes with Terminator 2: Judgment Day star Robert Patrick. In an interview, Meloni explained that the two met for the first time and became good friends during the shooting of "Demons", saying: "Every once in a while, you'll get a great actor who for whatever reason, you'll speak the same language." The second episode "Design" was a crossover with the Law & Order episode "Flaw". Estella Warren and Lynda Carter starred in the episode as a mother-daughter pair of con-artists. When discussing her role, Carter said: "Having so often been the heroine, I thoroughly enjoyed playing a grifter and exploring some of the darker aspects of human nature." In the same episode, one of their marks was played by Bobby Flay, the then-husband of former SVU star Stephanie March.

The sixth episode "Raw" featured Marcia Gay Harden playing an undercover agent. Her character is initially believed to be a white-supremacist named Star Morrison and is later revealed to be Dana Lewis of the FBI. Harden would go on to play the character thrice more in SVU. In the following episode "Name", detectives investigate a perpetrator played by Richard Bright. This episode was the last of Richard Bright's works that was released before his death in 2006. Dean Cain starred in the eighth episode "Starved" as what Neal Baer called "a very handsome guy who may or may not be involved in a series of serial rapes".

Keri Lynn Pratt guest starred in the episode "Rockabye" as a teenage mother who self-aborts. In a 2012 interview, shortly after he departed as the SVU showrunner, Neal Baer recalled: "I just loved doing shows on SVU that raised these really tough trenchant issues. Could we still do those? SVU is still on. Could we still do a show about a teen access to abortion? I'm not sure." In the eleventh episode "Alien", Raquel Castro played the child of a lesbian couple named Emma. When one of her mothers dies, she lies about being sexually abused as part of her grandmother's petition for custody. Graduate student Morgan Blue analyzed this episode and wrote: "By the end of this episode, it's clear that the detectives believed Emma was innocent, but were not taken in by the 'myth of a spotlessly honest child.'" The episode "Infected" guest starred Malcolm David Kelley as a child who witnesses gun violence and goes on to commit it himself. His appearance on the NBC program was promoted by emphasizing his breakout role on Lost. A report by AOL TV noted this unusual move of referring to another network's show.

In "Taboo", Schuyler Fisk guest starred as a young mother who has abandoned at least two babies in order to cover up incest. This was one of the more memorable roles for the actress according to a 2011 interview in which she said: "When I did Law & Order: SVU, Mariska Hargitay was particularly good to me and I actually enjoyed diving into a dark place for that character." The sixteenth episode "Gone" showed three teenage boys on trial for the murder of a teenage girl whose body was never found. Susan Saint James guest starred as their attorney, marking her first television role in ten years. Saint James stated in an interview that she was eager to play a Law & Order part and would have played a judge if it had been up to her. The same interview revealed that she was a long-time fan of SVU having watched "almost every episode multiple times." Another Season 7 guest star who mentioned being a fan of the program was Chris "Ludacris" Bridges who said: "Once you start watching a television show that you love you can't stop watching it." Ludacris guest starred in "Venom" as Darius Parker, a member of Fin Tutuola's family with a dark past and a complicated relationship with Fin's son. This role united Ludacris with fellow rapper Ice-T. When being interviewed, Bridges joked: "No, we don't rap on the SVU set. It's all about acting."

The episode "Fault" featured what Neal Baer called "an unusual and forceful performance from Lou Diamond Phillips". Phillips, who was a fan of the program already played Victor Paul Gitano, a recently released sex offender who kidnaps two children and puts Detectives Benson and Stabler in a situation where their partnership is pushed to its limits. "Fault" has been named one of Hargitay's favorite episodes multiple times. In the episode "Fat", Anthony Anderson portrayed Detective Lucius Blaine, Stabler's temporary partner. Anderson would go on to portray Detective Kevin Bernard on the original Law & Order series from 2008 to 2010. The following episode "Web" showed Connor Paolo return to the series after guest starring as a different character in the fourth season. Brittany Snow concluded the season by playing an impressionable teen with bipolar disorder in "Influence".

Episodes

References

Bibliography

External links
 Law & Order: Special Victims Unit Season 7 at TVGuide.com
 Law & Order: Special Victims Unit Season 7 – TV IV
 Season 7 episodes at IMDb.com

07
2005 American television seasons
2006 American television seasons
Bipolar disorder in fiction
fr:Liste des épisodes de New York, unité spéciale#Septième saison (2005–2006)